WAOV (1450 AM) is a radio station broadcasting a News Talk Information format. Licensed to Vincennes, Indiana, United States, the station is currently owned by Old Northwest Broadcasting, Inc. and features programming from AP Radio, ESPN Radio and Premiere Radio Networks.

The call letters WAOV come from the popular 1900 novel Alice of Old Vincennes by Maurice Thompson and was adopted when the station originated in 1940.

Notable former on-air staff 
 David Goodnow

References

External links

AOV